Mohamed Yusuf Abdirahman also known as Murad is a Somali politician, and the longest serving Mayor of Burao, the capital and the largest city of Togdheer region of Somaliland, serving from 2012 to 2021. He belongs to the Reer Biniin, Ahmed Farah sub-division of the Habr Je'lo Isaaq. He was succeeded by Abdirisaq Ibrahim Abdi on 20 June 2021 after the 2021 Somaliland municipal elections.

See also

 Mayor of Burao
 Burao

References

Living people
Mayors of places in Somaliland
People from Burao
Somaliland politicians
Year of birth missing (living people)